The Rose of Sharon Blooms Again was a popular South Korean novel by Kim Jin-myung (김진명) written in 1993, and No.1 bestseller for several weeks in 1994 which extolls pan-Korean nationalism.

Plot
The story was set in the present and revolved around a South Korean scientist who secretly helps North Korea develop nuclear weapons which are then used to ward off Japanese aggression.

Novel 
Kim Jin - myung 's novel, "The Rose of Sharon Blooms Again" in 1993, appeared a physicist who was killed by a duke of a powerful country in developing a nuclear weapon for the Republic of Korea. He writes that a novel physicist is a model of "Lee Hwiso" and that the story of the word is based on the Kong seokha's novel "Nuclear Physicist Words". This book sold more than three million copies and became a bestseller.

Film
The film version opened on 20 May 1995. Director was Jung Jin-woo (정진우) and the actors included Jeong Bo-seok (정보석), Hwang Shin-hye (황신혜), Jeon Bok-yeon (전복연), Lee Deok-hwa (이덕화) and Park Geun-hyung (박근형).

References

1993 novels
20th-century South Korean novels
South Korean novels adapted into films